Ponsiano Ngabirano, is a wealthy businessman and entrepreneur in Uganda. He is the founder, chairman and managing director of Capital Shoppers Supermarkets, a chain of supermarket stores, which he partly owns. The stores in the chain are based in Kampala, Uganda. In 2012, the New Vision newspaper listed him among the wealthiest individuals in Uganda.

Background
He was born in Rukungiri District, in the Western Region of Uganda, circa 1955. In 1997, he and his family, established the supermarket chain, which owns and operates four supermarket stores in Kampala, Uganda's capital city. Capital Shoppers Supermarkets  is the largest locally owned supermarket chain in the country. The family-owned chain maintains a customer-loyalty program that offers 4 percent rebate on purchases, the highest in the industry in Uganda, as of 2014. In January 2012, Ugandan media reports indicated that the supermarket chain is owned at least in part by Ponsiano Ngabirano.

Businesses and investments
As of August 2014 Capital Shoppers Supermarket chain maintained branches at the following locations: (a) Central Kampala: Dastur Street, Nakasero Hill, Kampala (b) Nakawa Branch: Port Bell Road, Nakawa, Kampala (c) Ntinda Branch: Capital Shoppers Mall, Ntinda Road, Ntinda, Kampala and (d) Garden City Branch: Garden City Mall, Kampala.

In addition to the shareholding in Capital Shoppers Supermarkets, Ngabirano and members of his family own large chunks of land inside and outside Kampala.

Net worth
According to the New Vision newspaper, in 2012, Ponsiano Ngabirano's net worth was estimated at US$20 million.

See also
 List of wealthiest people in Uganda

References

External links
 UNBS directs supermarkets to stop selling substandard products As of 18 January 2019.

1955 births
Living people
Ugandan businesspeople
People from Rukungiri District
People from Western Region, Uganda